"Gotta Tell You" is the debut single of Irish singer Samantha Mumba and the title track from her first studio album. The song was written and produced by the Swedish team Bag & Arnthor (Anders Bagge and Arnthor Birgisson), with Mumba co-writing. "Gotta Tell You" was released on 2 June 2000 and became an international hit, peaking at number one in Ireland and New Zealand, number two in the United Kingdom, and number three in Australia. In the United States, it reached number four on the Billboard Hot 100, spending 22 weeks on that chart. In 2001, the song won a Meteor Music Award for Best Selling Irish Single – Female Artist.

Composition
Having a moderate tempo with 110 beats per minute, the song is written in the key of C minor and follows the chord progression of A–B–Cm in the verses and A7–B–Cm–C–B–G in the song's chorus, with the C major chord being a picardy third (or a borrowed chord), as it is a parallel key. Mumba's vocals span from E3 to B4.

Music video
The music video shows Mumba walking, running and dancing around a city and running to catch a plane. It also includes Mumba doing minor stunts which include flipping off a building onto the street and jumping onto and off a moving firetruck. The video was shot in city of Fuengirola, Málaga, Spain.

Track listings

UK and Australian CD single
 "Gotta Tell You" – 3:20
 "Can It Be Love?" – 3:16
 "Where Does It End Now?" – 3:40
 "Gotta Tell You" (CD-ROM video) – 3:20

European CD single
 "Gotta Tell You" – 3:20
 "Gotta Tell You" (Sleaze Sisters mix edit) – 3:59

Australian limited-edition CD single
 "Gotta Tell You" – 3:20
 "Gotta Tell You" (Teddy Riley remix) – 3:47
 "Gotta Tell You" (Basstoy mix) – 9:10

US CD single
 "Gotta Tell You" – 3:20
 "Gotta Tell You" (Mindchime dub) – 5:07

Credits and personnel
Credits are lifted from the UK CD single liner notes.

Studios
 Mixed at Shortlist Analogue (Stockholm, Sweden)
 Mastered at 777 Productions (London, England)

Personnel

 Bag & Arnthor – production, arrangement
 Anders Bagge – writing
 Arnthor Birgisson – writing, background vocals
 Samantha Mumba – writing
 Anders von Hofsten – background vocals
 Jeanette Olsson – background vocals
 Mats Berntoft – guitar
 Stockholm Session Strings – strings
 Jansson & Jansson – string arrangement
 Alar Suurna – mixing
 Arun Chakraverty – mastering
 Rankin – photography

Charts

Weekly charts

Year-end charts

Certifications

Release history

Micky Modelle vs. Samantha Mumba version

Irish DJ Micky Modelle remixed the song and released it as a single in 2008 through All Around the World Productions. After Mumba heard the remix, she liked the song and re-recorded some of the vocals. She promoted the song on the Clubland Live Tour in 2008. This was the final single to be released from Mumba following her announcement of retiring from music in 2011.

Music video
A video for the song was filmed throughout London and Belfast in May 2008 and was premiered on 13 June 2008. The video features Micky and Mumba in a conference room with various clones of Mumba as various maps of cities in the UK moving around her, with the maps indicating that "Club energy levels are low".

Mumba and the clones of herself go out to the cities clubs where the people in the club start dancing and the club energy levels are restored.

References

2000 debut singles
2000 songs
Dance-pop songs
Interscope Records singles
Irish Singles Chart number-one singles
Micky Modelle songs
Number-one singles in New Zealand
Polydor Records singles
Samantha Mumba songs
Songs written by Anders Bagge
Songs written by Arnthor Birgisson